Saint-Brieuc station (French: Gare de Saint-Brieuc) is a railway station serving the town Saint-Brieuc, Côtes-d'Armor department, western France. It is situated on the Paris–Brest railway and the branch line to Pontivy (freight) and Le Légué (sometimes touristic).

Services

The station is served by high speed trains to Brest, Rennes and Paris, and regional trains to Brest, Lannion, Dol-de-Bretagne and Rennes.

References

Railway stations in Côtes-d'Armor
TER Bretagne
Railway stations in France opened in 1863
Saint-Brieuc